Fay Rusling is a British comedy writer and performer, most known for her work in the sketch show Smack the Pony and the sitcom Green Wing. She has had a working partnership with fellow writer Oriane Messina since 1999.

Performer 

Green Wing (2004-2007) Playing Nurse.
Speeding in Channel 4's Comedy Lab (2005) Playing Abigail.

Writer 

Smack the Pony (1999-2003)
2DTV (2001-2004)
Green Wing (2004-2007)
Speeding in Channel 4's Comedy Lab (2005)
Campus (2009-2011)
Me and Mrs Jones (2012) (also creator)
Brief Encounters (TV series) (2016) (also creator)
Breeders (2020-2021)

Radio 

Bearded Ladies - (2005-Present, Writer and Performer)

External links 
Fay Rusling in BBC Comedy Guide
Green Wing "microsite" at Channel4.com
British Sitcom Guide  Green Wing writers.

British comedy writers
Living people
Year of birth missing (living people)